The Mystery of the Clockwork Sparrow is the debut novel of British children's author Katherine Woodfine, initially published by Egmont Publishing in June 2015. The novel is the first book in The Sinclair's Mysteries, a quartet of mystery-adventure novels set in Edwardian England.The Mystery of the Clockwork Sparrow was Waterstones Children's Book of the Month in June 2015. The novel was inspired by Katherine's love of classic children's adventure stories, E. Nesbit, Frances Hodgson Burnett, Enid Blyton and Nancy Drew.

Introduction 
Enter a world of bonbons, hats, perfumes and mysteries around every corner. Wonder at the daring theft of the priceless clockwork sparrow!

Plot 
Left penniless when her father dies, Sophie is pleased to find a job in the millinery department of Sinclair’s, soon to be London’s largest and most glamorous department store. There, she makes friends with Billy, a junior porter, and beautiful Lil, who is one of the department store “mannequins” by day and an aspiring actress by night. And, together with the help of vagabond Joe, they soon find out who stole the priceless jewellery.

Just before the store is due to open, there is a daring burglary, including the theft of the priceless Clockwork Sparrow. When Sophie herself becomes a suspect, the only solution is to solve the mystery of the clockwork sparrow. Her friends Lil and Billy help her to solve the crime.

Setting 
This detective story is set in an Edwardian department store owned by an enigmatic New York millionaire. The department store setting was inspired by the likes of Selfridges and Fortnum and Mason.

Publishing details 
 Author: Katherine Woodfine
 First published: June 2015
 
 Publisher: Egmont Publishing
 Age range: 9+ years
 Genre: Children's Mystery Adventure Series

References

External links
 Goodreads title page

2015 British novels
2015 children's books
British mystery novels
British children's novels
Children's historical novels
Children's mystery novels
Novels about orphans
2015 debut novels
Egmont Books books